The 2004 Central American Junior and Youth Championships in Athletics were held at the Estadio Nacional in San José, Costa Rica, between June 11–12, 2004. Organized by the Central American Isthmus Athletic Confederation (CADICA), it was the 17th edition of the Junior (U-20) and the 12th edition of the Youth (U-18) competition. A total of 84 events were contested, 43 by boys and 41 by girls.

Medal summary
Complete results can be found on the CADICA, the CACAC, and on the AthletismoCR.com webpages.

Junior

Boys (U-20)

Girls (U-20)

Youth

Boys (U-18)

Girls (U-18)

Medal table
The medal table was published.

Team trophies
The placing table for team trophy awarded to the 1st place overall team (boys and girls categories) was published.

Overall

Participation
A total number of 279 athletes and officials were reported to participate in the event.

 (17)
 (95)
 (46)
 (36)
 (14)
 (37)
 Panamá (34)

References

 
International athletics competitions hosted by Costa Rica
Central American Junior
Central American Junior
2004 in youth sport